Werner Graeff (also Gräff), 24 August 24, 1901, Wuppertal - 29 August 29, 1978, Blacksburg, Virginia) was a German sculptor, painter, graphic artist, photographer, film maker and inventor.

In 1921 he started studying at the Bauhaus in Weimar. Here he soon became under the influence of Theo van Doesburg, and participated in a meeting in Weimar in May 1922 where van Doesberg, El Lissitzky and Hans Richter planned the intervention of the International Constructivist Faction at the International Congress of Progressive Artists held in Düsseldorf, 29–31 May 1922.

G
In 1923 he worked with Richter and Lissitzky on the production of G: Material zur elementaren Gestaltung (Journal for Elementary Construction).

1n 1928 he co-wrote the film Ghosts Before Breakfast with Hans Richter.

Gallery
There are two of Graeff's sculptures on display at the Skulpturenmuseum Glaskasten in Marl, North Rhine-Westphalia.

References

1901 births
1978 deaths